Kokhav Ya'akov is a religious Israeli settlement organized as a community settlement in the West Bank. Located near the Palestinian town of al-Bireh, it is administered by Mateh Binyamin Regional Council.

The international community considers Israeli settlements in the West Bank illegal under international law, but the Israeli government disputes this.

History
According to ARIJ Israel confiscated land from two Palestinian villages in order to construct Kokhav Ya'akov:

 2,037 dunams from Kafr 'Aqab
 284 dunams from Burqa

The settlement was established in 1985 by the Amana settlement movement, and was initially named Abir Ya'akov after rabbi Yaakov Abuhatzeira. In 1988, its name was changed to Kokhav Ya'akov.

The Haredi neighborhood of Tel Zion, established in 1990, is part of the village. Its community boasts of over 800 families, including a large growing Litvish segment. The Yishuv is headed by the warm Rabbi Avraham Goldberg. A recent housing project was launched to attract new members, and over 100 apartments have been occupied. Two new Kollelim have been established under the directive of Rabbi Chaim Kanievsky. Rabbi Noe is the leader of the younger members, together with full support of Rabbi Goldberg.

Yemen Gallery
In March 2013 a heritage and tourism site promoting the legacy of Yemenite Jewry opened in Kokhav Ya'akov. Founded by Shoham Simchi, the Yemen Gallery houses an art gallery and a workshop that recreates the life of Yemen's Jews. The building itself is designed in the spirit of traditional Yemenite architecture.

Notable residents
 Bat-El Gatterer (born 1988), Israeli taekwondo Olympian and European champion

References

External links
Official website

Religious Israeli settlements
Populated places established in 1985
Mateh Binyamin Regional Council
1985 establishments in the Israeli Civil Administration area